Monastery Among the Temple Trees is a novel by Sri Lankan writer Jayasena Jayakody. It was translated to English from his famous Sinhalese novels - "Pichcha Mala" and "Araliya Mal Aramaya".

Plot summary
The story is about Rahula, a Buddhist monk. Novels depict how Rev. Rahula exists in today's tumultuous society. While he gets free from all the worldly desires, he manages to make free the others who have highly involved with them. Eventually people who went against Rev. Rahula become more mature minded and mentally advanced individuals.

References

Sri Lankan English-language novels
Sinhala-language books
2010 novels